Patatin-like phospholipase domain-containing protein 3 (PNPLA3) also known as adiponutrin (ADPN), acylglycerol O-acyltransferase or calcium-independent phospholipase A2-epsilon (iPLA2-epsilon)  is an enzyme that in humans is encoded by the PNPLA3 gene.

Function 

Adiponutrin is a triacylglycerol lipase that mediates triacylglycerol hydrolysis in adipocytes. The encoded protein, which appears to be membrane bound, may be involved in the balance of energy usage/storage in adipocytes.

Genomics

The gene is located on the long arm of chromosome 22 at band 13.31 (22q13.31). It lies on the Watson (plus) strand and is 40,750 bases in length.

Upstream of the gene, putative binding sites for several transcription factors have been identified. These include PPAR-gamma, POU2F1, and POU2F2. If any of these transcriptions factors are actually involved in the regulation of this gene is not known at present.

Biochemistry

The recommended name for the gene product is patatin-like phospholipase domain-containing protein 3. It is a Single-pass type II membrane protein and is a multifunctional enzyme with both triacylglycerol lipase and acylglycerol O-acyltransferase activities.  It is involved in the triacylglycerol hydrolysis in adipocytes and may play a role in energy metabolism.

The mature protein is 481 amino acids in length and the predicted molecular weight is 52.865 kiloDaltons (kDa). Two of the isoforms have been described, but the functional significance - if any - of these forms is not known.

Clinical relevance

An association between alcoholic liver disease in caucasians and variations in this gene has been confirmed.  A mutation of isoleucine to methionine (I[ATC]>M[ATG]) SNP rs738409 has been confirmed to increase susceptibility to non-alcoholic liver disease and also to have effects in diabetes.

References

Further reading 

 
 
 
 
 
 

EC 3.1.1